Yugoslav Communist Party of Montenegro (JKP CG) is a minor communist political party in Montenegro. The party mostly gathers pensioners, mainly with Titoistic and nostalgic feelings towards life in the former Communist Yugoslavia (SFRJ).

History
The political party was founded on 25 September 2009 as a result of the merger of two political parties: League of Communists of Yugoslavia - Communists of Montenegro and Yugoslav Communists of Montenegro.

During the 2010 municipal elections, Yugoslav Communist Party of Montenegro gained 1 seat in the Municipal Parliament of Plužine.

The party participated in 2012 parliamentary elections in the coalition "Together", along with the Party of United Pensioners and the Disabled (PUPI), but did not achieve parliamentary status, winning 0.38% of votes.

In August 2016, the party joined the opposition alliance Democratic Front (DF) for the 2016 parliamentary election. Party also supported the big tent For the Future of Montenegro (ZBCG) list for the 2020 parliamentary election.

Elections

Parliamentary election

References

External links 
 

Communist parties in Montenegro
2009 establishments in Montenegro
Political parties established in 2009